Morgan Edward Murphy (February 14, 1867 – October 3, 1938) was an American Major League Baseball player who played 11 seasons as a catcher, most notably with the two time league champions Boston Reds.

Sign stealing
Murphy is mostly known today for his complicated, but innovative sign stealing techniques. There was a specific letter "O" that he would open or close to signal to the batter what pitch was going to be delivered. The third base coach would then signal to the batter the sign. This latest scheme was discovered, however, when Tommy Corcoran of the Cincinnati Reds, tripped over he thought to be a vine coming out from under the ground, as he was rounding third base. Upon further inspection, the vine turned out to be a telegraph wire, and he proceeded to pull up out of the ground until it reach the spot where Murphy relayed his signals.

Post-career
Murphy died at the age of 71 in Providence, Rhode Island, and is interred at St. Francis Cemetery in Pawtucket, Rhode Island.

References

External links

1867 births
1938 deaths
Boston Reds (PL) players
Boston Reds (AA) players
Cincinnati Reds players
St. Louis Browns (NL) players
Pittsburgh Pirates players
Philadelphia Phillies players
Philadelphia Athletics players
Baseball players from Providence, Rhode Island
Major League Baseball catchers
New Britain (minor league baseball) players
Springfield (minor league baseball) players
Boston Blues players
Lowell Magicians players
Haverhill (minor league baseball) players
Lowell Chippies players
Lowell (minor league baseball) players
burials in Rhode Island